Susanne is a Danish film of 1950, directed by  and starring Astrid Villaume in the title role.

The film won three prizes at the 1950 Bodil Awards: Best Actor (Erik Mørk), Best Actress (Astrid Villaume) and Best (Danish) Film.

Cast 
 Erik Mørk ... Hakon Riis
 Astrid Villaume ... Susanne Drewes
 Ellen Gottschalch ... Andrea Drewes
 Lis Løwert ... Helene Drewes
 Katy Valentin ... Louise Hallenberg

References

External links 
 
 
 

1950 films
1950 romantic drama films
Best Danish Film Bodil Award winners
Danish black-and-white films
Danish romantic drama films
1950s Danish-language films
Films based on Danish novels